Red Istanbul is a 2017 film directed by Ferzan Özpetek, based on the novel written by Özpetek, published in 2013. The film was shot in Turkish language with a cast composed entirely of Turkish actors, 16 years after his second work Harem Suare, director Özpetek came back to shoot a film in Istanbul. The film's first international promotion was held at the Rome Film Festival.

Plot
The writer Orhan Şahin returns to Istanbul after so many years to help the well-known director Deniz Soysal to write his first novel. Orhan finds himself to look with nostalgia at the places where he was born and raised, reliving the relationships with friends, family and past loves.

Cast
 Halit Ergenç: Orhan Şahin
 Tuba Büyüküstün: Neval
 Mehmet Günsür: Yusuf
 Nejat İşler: Deniz Soysal
 Serra Yılmaz: Sibel
 Zerrin Tekindor: Aylin
 Ayten Gökçer: Betül
 İpek Bilgin: Güzin
 Çiğdem Selışık Onat: Süreyya
 Reha Özcan: Ali

Production
The shooting was expected to begin in September 2015, but after several delays, due to the delicate social / political situation of the Turkish city, filming officially began April 12, 2016, for a total of seven weeks. The sequences have taken place entirely in Istanbul, but in some areas, for safety reasons, it was not possible to shoot. The film cost 5.5 million Euro.

Distribution 
The film has been released in Italian language in Italy on 2 March 2017, while in Turkey it was released on March 3. It was distributed by 01 Distribution in Italy and by Mars Dağıtım in Turkey.

References

External links
 
 

2017 films
Turkish multilingual films
Italian multilingual films
Films directed by Ferzan Özpetek
Films shot in Istanbul